Kevin  Corrigan (born ) is an American character actor. He has appeared mostly in independent films and television since the 1990s, including as Uncle Eddie on the sitcom Grounded for Life (2001–2005). His film appearances include supporting roles in Goodfellas (1990), Walking and Talking (1996), Henry Fool (1997), The Departed (2006), Superbad (2007), Pineapple Express (2008), Seven Psychopaths (2012), The King of Staten Island (2020), and co-starring roles in Big Fan (2009) and Results (2015). He has been twice nominated for the Independent Spirit Award for Best Supporting Male.

Life and career 
Corrigan is a native of the Bronx, New York City. After studying at Lee Strasberg Theatre and Film Institute, he made his film debut in 1989 in Lost Angels, starring Donald Sutherland and Adam Horovitz. He was cast in Goodfellas as the younger brother of Henry Hill (Ray Liotta). During the independent film boom of the 1990s, Corrigan built a career playing quirky, unconventional characters in films such as True Romance, Living in Oblivion, Walking and Talking and Rhythm Thief. He made his television series debut as a cast member of the short-lived Rhea Perlman sitcom Pearl. He also appeared in the video for "Get Me" by the indie band Dinosaur Jr. in 1993.

Corrigan became well known for his role as the slacker Eddie Finnerty on the sitcom Grounded for Life, which ran for five seasons. After the show's cancellation, he returned to appearing in smaller film projects, with the exception of a role in Martin Scorsese's The Departed as the drug-dealing cousin of Leonardo DiCaprio's character. Since that film's success, he has appeared more regularly in high-profile films. He had roles in two Judd Apatow-produced films: Superbad, as the violent owner of the house where Jonah Hill's and Michael Cera's characters attempt to steal alcohol, and Pineapple Express, as one of the main villain's henchmen. He also appeared in Ridley Scott's American Gangster as an informant for Russell Crowe's character. Corrigan was also in the movie The Last Winter, as Motor, a mechanic. In 2009 he was in the Oscar-winning short film The New Tenants and guested on the science fiction drama Fringe as Sam Weiss. He played Sal in the critically praised independent film Big Fan, written and directed by Robert D. Siegel. In 2010, Corrigan starred in the John Landis-produced thriller Some Guy Who Kills People, directed by Jack Perez, and appeared in Tony Scott's Unstoppable. In 2015, he co-starred with Guy Pearce in Results, writer-director Andrew Bujalski's fifth feature film.

Personal life 
In 2001, Corrigan married actress Elizabeth Berridge, whom he met on the set of the independent film Broke Even. They have a daughter, Sadie Rose Corrigan.

Filmography

Films

Television series

Music videos 
 Featured in video for "Get Me" by Dinosaur Jr., from the album Where You Been, 1993
 Played band member Dan Bejar in video for "Moves" by The New Pornographers, from the album Together, 2010
 Played the Dad in video for "Safe Word" by the band Choke Chains, fronted by his long time friend and prolific Detroit musician, Thomas Jackson Potter, 2016
 Played a Parking Enforcement Officer in video for "Loading Zones" by the musician Kurt Vile, 2018

See also 

List of Puerto Ricans

References

External links 
 
 Kevin Corrigan at Deja Scene
 Kevin Corrigan in Safe Word, by Choke Chains.

Male actors from New York City
American male film actors
American male stage actors
American male television actors
American people of Irish descent
American people of Puerto Rican descent
Lee Strasberg Theatre and Film Institute alumni
Living people
Hispanic and Latino American male actors
20th-century American male actors
21st-century American male actors
People from the Bronx
Year of birth missing (living people)